St. Stephen's Memorial Episcopal Church is parish of the Episcopal Diocese of Massachusetts in Lynn, Massachusetts founded in 1844. It is noted for its historic church at  74 South Common Street.

Completed in 1881, the church is of a Romanesque Revival design by Ware & Van Brunt. It was built as a memorial to the children of Enoch Reddington Mudge of Swampscott, member of a leading Lynn family. It was built of granite quarried from Mudge's Swampscott estate, and trimmed with red brick and stone. The interior is richly decorated, with parquet and mosaic floors, carved timber ends, and a number of stained glass windows.

The church was listed on the National Register of Historic Places as St. Stephen's Memorial Church on September 7, 1979, and included in the Lynn Common Historic District in 1992.

Gallery

See also

National Register of Historic Places listings in Lynn, Massachusetts
National Register of Historic Places listings in Essex County, Massachusetts

References

External links
 

Episcopal church buildings in Massachusetts
Churches on the National Register of Historic Places in Massachusetts
Churches in Essex County, Massachusetts
National Register of Historic Places in Lynn, Massachusetts
Historic district contributing properties in Massachusetts
Churches completed in 1881
Romanesque Revival architecture in Massachusetts
Religious organizations established in 1844